The 2018 NCAA Division I women's volleyball tournament began on November 29, 2018, and concluded on December 15 at the Target Center in Minneapolis, Minnesota. The tournament field was announced on November 25, 2018. Stanford beat Nebraska in the final to claim their eighth national championship.

Qualifying Teams

Bracket

Stanford Regional

Schedule

First round

Second round

Regional semifinals

Regional Final

BYU Regional

Schedule

First round

Second round

Regional semifinals

Regional Final

Illinois Regional

Schedule

First round

Second round

Regional semifinals

Regional Final

Minnesota Regional

Schedule

First round

Second round

Regional semifinals

Regional Final

Final four

National semifinals

National Championship

Final Four All-Tournament Team

Kathryn Plummer – Stanford (Co-Most Outstanding Player)
Morgan Hentz – Stanford (Co-Most Outstanding Player)
Jenna Gray – Stanford
Audriana Fitzmorris – Stanford
Mikaela Foecke – Nebraska
Lauren Stivrins – Nebraska
Jacqueline Quade – Illinois

Record by conference

The columns R32, S16, E8, F4, CM, and NC respectively stand for the Round of 32, Sweet Sixteen, Elite Eight, Final Four, Championship Match, and National Champion.

Media Coverage
First and second round matches will be streamed or televised by local school RSN's or streaming services. The 3rd round to the finals will all be streamed by WatchESPN or televised by ESPN Networks.

First & Second Rounds
Ken Landis & Kyle Partain – Orlando, Florida (UCFKnights.tv)
Paul Sunderland & Nell Fortner – Austin, Texas (LHN)
Blaine Best – Madison, Wisconsin (BTN2Go)
Kanoa Leahey & Chris McLauchlin – Eugene, Oregon (SPEC HI)
Rich Burk & Nicole Rigonu – Eugene, Oregon (P12 OR)
Josh Rowntree & Amanda Silay – Pittsburgh, Pennsylvania (ESPN3)
Donny Baarns, Shannon Smolinski, & John Fanta – Omaha, Nebraska (FS Go)
Dick Gabriel & Kathy DeBoer – Lexington, Kentucky (ESPN3 & SEC+) 
David Hadar – University Park, Pennsylvania (BTN2Go) 
Dean Linke & Audrey Flaugh – University Park, Pennsylvania (BTN) 
Paul Duchesne – Los Angeles, California (P12+)
Third & Fourth Rounds
Courtney Lyle & Jenny Hazelwood – Stanford, California
Sam Gore & Dain Blanton – Provo, Utah
Semifinals
Paul Sunderland, Karch Kiraly, & Holly Rowe– Minneapolis, Minnesota

First & Second Rounds
No commentary for UNI/Pepperdine, Syracuse/Yale, Arizona/Missouri, & Tennessee/Colorado State
Stephen Cohn, Anton Pasquale (Fri), & Isaac Trotter (Sat) – Champaign, Illinois (BTN2Go) 
Ryan Russell & Chase Thomas – Minneapolis, Minnesota (BTN2Go) 
Mike Monaco & Laura Bush – Minneapolis, Minnesota (BTN) 
Larry Punteney & Kathi Wieskamp – Lincoln, Nebraska (NET)
Chris Reisner, Jack Phillips, & Dan Avington – Milwaukee, Wisconsin (MUTV) 
Robbie Bullough – Provo, Utah (TheW.tv)
Spencer Linton, Kristen Kozlowski, & Jason Shepherd (Fri) – Provo, Utah (BYUtv)
Steve Grubbs – Pullman, Washington (P12+)
Anthony Passarelli & Ted Enberg – Stanford, California (P12+) 
Ted Enberg & Rich Fellner – Stanford, California (P12 BAY) 
Third & Fourth Rounds
Tiffany Greene & Missy Whittemore – Champaign, Illinois
Paul Sunderland & Karch Kiraly – Minneapolis, Minnesota
National Championship
Paul Sunderland, Karch Kiraly, & Holly Rowe– Minneapolis, Minnesota

References

December 2018 sports events in the United States
 
NCAA
NCAA Women's Volleyball Championship
Sports competitions in Minneapolis